= Ridiculous Bitch =

American alternative rock band

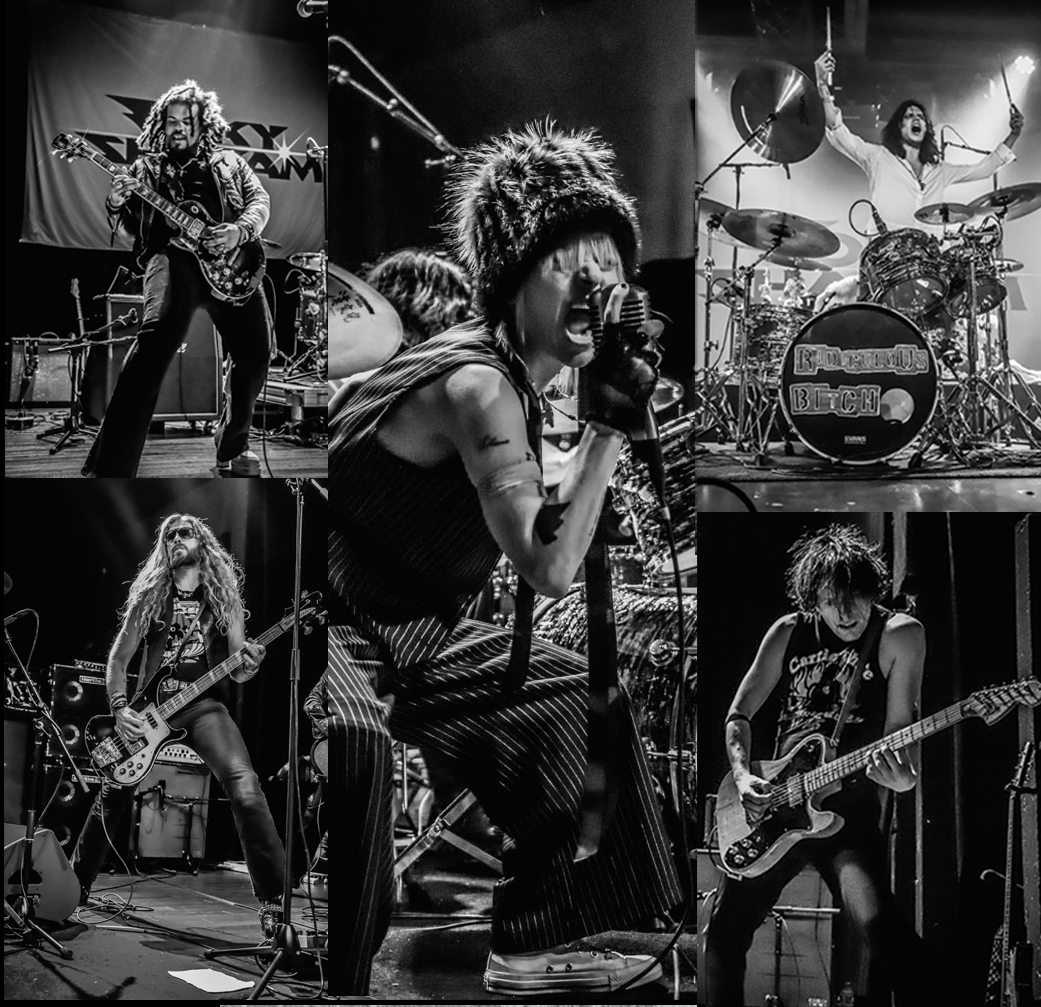
- Photos by Krys Fox

Background information
- Also known as: Ridiculous B!tch, Ridiculous B., rxdxculousbxtch, R.B.
- Origin: New York, New York, United States
- Genres: Glam rock; alternative rock; hard rock; pop rock
- Years active: 2020–present
- Formerly of: Wildstreet, The Nasty Things, Bambi, Murder My Love, Malachi Crunch
- Members: Karen Xerri; Jimmie Marlowe; Dominick Martes; Don Berger; Lach Driver
- Past members: Jonny D
- Website: ridiculousbitch.com

Ridiculous Bitch is an American rock band from New York, New York, formed in 2020. As of 2026, the band's lineup consists of lead vocalist Karen Xerri, guitarist Jimmie Marlowe, guitarist Dominick Martes, bassist Don Berger, and drummer Lach Driver. The band released their debut album Granada independently in 2023. After touring Japan in early 2026, the band released its second album Die About It in the spring.
